Tokalon is an unincorporated community in Logan County, Arkansas, United States.

Notes

Unincorporated communities in Logan County, Arkansas
Unincorporated communities in Arkansas
Arkansas placenames of Native American origin